Sheikh Manzoor Elahi was a Pakistani politician who served as the Caretaker Chief Minister of Punjab, Pakistan from July 19th, 1993 to October 20th 1993.

References

Year of birth missing
2008 deaths
Chief Ministers of Punjab, Pakistan